Od ljubavi oslepeo is the fifth studio album of Montenegrin singer Šako Polumenta, which was released in 2000.

Track listing 
 Od ljubavi oslepeo
 Miris dunja
 Vratit će tebi Bog
 Kraljica
 Na ivici ponora
 Od sreće sam daleko
 Ne zaboravi me
 Kud me ovaj život vodi
 Sin poroka
 Ljubio bih zemlju za te
 Crna Goro mila

2000 albums
Šako Polumenta albums